Graham Henderson may refer to:

 Graham Henderson (badminton), Irish National Badminton Champion
 Graham Henderson (Canadian lawyer), Canadian lawyer and president of Music Canada
 Graham Henderson (cultural entrepreneur) (born 1964), British solicitor and entrepreneur
 Graham Henderson, Vice-Chancellor of Teesside University from 2003 to 2014
 Graham L. Henderson, Scottish architect, and father of Malaysian actress Amelia Thripura Henderson 
 Graham Henderson, musician in Irish Celtic rock band Moving Hearts

See also
 Graeme Henderson